Fascism in Britain is a book by Philip Rees.  It is a bibliography of publications and articles by and about fascists and the radical right in Great Britain.  It opens with an introductory essay on "What is Fascism?".

It was published in 1979 as a 243-page hardcover by Harvester Press in Britain, and Humanities Press in the United States.

1979 non-fiction books
Books about fascism
Books about politics of the United Kingdom
Books by Philip Rees
British non-fiction books
English-language books
Fascism in the United Kingdom
Published bibliographies